The Lithuania women's national volleyball team represents Lithuania in international women's volleyball competitions and friendly matches.

History
Although volleyball was always regularly played in Lithuania, both the country's men's and women's national teams were inactive for a long period. In 2013 the Lithuania women's national volleyball team participated in the 2014 FIVB Volleyball Women's World Championship qualification (CEV) tournament, the first Lithuanian team international appearance after their extended absence.

References

External links 
Lithuanian Volleyball Federation

Volleyball
National women's volleyball teams
Volleyball in Lithuania